Armley is a ward in the metropolitan borough of the City of Leeds, West Yorkshire, England.  It contains 49 listed buildings that are recorded in the National Heritage List for England.  Of these, five are listed at Grade II*, the middle of the three grades, and the others are at Grade II, the lowest grade.  The ward contains the former Armley Mills, later the Leeds Industrial Museum at Armley Mills, Armley Prison, Armley Park, and Armley Cemetery, all of which contain listed buildings.  The Leeds and Liverpool Canal passes through the ward, and three bridges crossing it are listed.  The other listed buildings include a former country house, smaller houses, cottages and associated structures, another former textile mill, public houses, churches and associated structures, schools, and a public library.


Key

Buildings

References

Citations

Sources

 

Lists of listed buildings in West Yorkshire